John Roberts (born 1885) was a professional association footballer, who played in the Football League for Wolverhampton Wanderers, and in the Southern Football League for Bristol Rovers.

Primarily playing as an inside left, Roberts scored fourteen goals in 24 league appearances for The Wanderers, having joined them from Bloxwich Strollers in 1906. He only remained in Wolverhampton for a single season, during which he was their top goalscorer, before being signed for Bristol Rovers in May 1907. He was again his club's top scorer in 1907–08, again scoring fourteen goals.

In total he made 82 appearances in the Southern League, scoring 28 times, before leaving to join Wrexham in 1910.

References

1885 births
Date of birth missing
Year of death missing
Sportspeople from Walsall
English footballers
Association football forwards
Bloxwich Strollers F.C. players
Wolverhampton Wanderers F.C. players
Bristol Rovers F.C. players
Wrexham A.F.C. players
English Football League players
Southern Football League players